The Theosophical Order of Service (TOS) is an international organization founded in 1908 by Annie Besant, the second International President of the Theosophical Society. Its motto is: "A union of those who love in the service of all that suffers." 

The TOS is found in many countries in the world and is engaged in various service projects that seek to alleviate suffering, such as medical missions, assistance during disasters, orphanages, scholarships, establishment of schools, rehabilitation of malnourished children, caring for the disabled, preventing cruelty to animals, promoting vegetarianism, character building for young people, etc. TOS members need not be members of the Theosophical Society, but it is administered by Theosophists.

External links
Theosophical Order of Service USA
Theosophical Order of Service: general information and links to international websites
 Central coordinating website for TOS centres around the world

Theosophy